Final X: Lincoln (2019) was an amateur wrestling event produced by USA Wrestling and FloSports held on June 14-15, 2019 at the Bob Devaney Sports Center in Lincoln, Nebraska.

History 
This event was the second that took place at the Bob Devaney Sports Center after one of last year's, also called Final X: Lincoln.

The headline was a rematch series between Jordan Burroughs and Isaiah Martinez. The pair had already wrestled at '18 Final X, resulting on Burroughs defeating Martinez twice, including a technical fall in the second match. After making the '18 World Team, Burroughs went on to place third at the World Championships and was now looking to make his ninth straight US World/Olympic Team.

The headline of the first session was a Greco-Roman match between eventual Pan American Champion G'Angelo Hancock and Lucas Sheridan. This was Hancock's attempt to make his fifth US World Team (including age-group).

Results

See also
Final X

References 

Amateur wrestling
Wrestling
Annual sporting events in the United States
Freestyle wrestling
Recurring sporting events established in 2018
Sports in Lincoln, Nebraska
Sports in Nebraska
Greco-Roman wrestling